Flyin' the Koop  is the second solo album by New Orleans drummer Stanton Moore. The album includes funk, rock and jazz. Moore's line-up for Flyin' the Koop is in part a combination of musicians with whom he played at a "SuperJam" at Tipitina's during Jazz Fest 2000.

Moore's concept for the album "was to have two saxes, bass and drums, and to improvise over loops..."  building the tracks upon rhythm. Melodies then developed through improvisation and composition by the saxophonists. "Magnolia Triangle" is a classic New Orleans composition in 5/4 meter from famed New Orleans drummer and composer James Black. "Let's Go" and "Hunch" are both contributions from the writing team of Charlie Dennard and Brian Seeger who were half of Moore's working band at the time, "Moore and More". The track "For the Record" is a composition by Seeger written specifically for this session.

On Flyin' the Koop Moore played vintage Gretsch drums with an 18-inch bass drum. Wood plays upright and Hoffner bass. Many fans speculated at first that the name of the solo album implied that Moore could be leaving his band Galactic. Moore explained that the metaphor which regarded "freeing yourself from the limitations" of music styles was combined with the location of the recording studio being on a former chicken farm in Cotati, California.

Musicians 
 Stanton Moore - drums
 Karl Denson - saxophone, flute
 Skerik - saxophone
 Chris Wood - bass
 Brian Seeger - guitar

Track listing 
 "Tang the Hump"
 "Fallin' Off"
 "Let's Go"
 "Launcho Diablo"
 "Prairie Sunset"
 "Things Fall Apart"
 "Amy's Lament"
 "Magnolia Triangle"
 "Hunch"
 "Bottoms Up"
 "For the Record"
 "Organized Chaos"

References 

Flyin' The Koop Glenn Astarita, AllAboutJazz.com, March 1, 2002, Retrieved June 22, 2007
[ Flyin' the Koop] Thom Jurek, AllMusic.com, Retrieved June 22, 2007

Stanton Moore albums
2002 albums
Blue Thumb Records albums